Lion Kalentjev (born 9 January 2000) is a professional footballer who plays as a forward for Derde Divisie club DOVO. Born in the Netherlands to Russian parents, he represented Russia internationally on junior levels.

Club career
He spent most of his junior career at Feyenoord and represented the club in the 2017–18 UEFA Youth League before joining NEC before the 2019–20 season. In November 2020, he was sent on loan to Eerste Divisie club TOP Oss.

He made his professional Eerste Divisie debut for TOP Oss on 14 December 2020 in a game against Jong FC Utrecht. As his contract expired with NEC on 30 June 2021, Kalentjev practiced with TOP Oss ahead of the new season.

On 12 July 2021, Kalentjev signed with DOVO, competing in the Derde Divisie. He made his debut on 21 August, also scoring his first goal for the club, in a 3–3 draw against VVOG.

Personal life
He was born in Groningen four months after his parents arrived to Netherlands from Russia as asylum seekers.

References

External links

2000 births
Footballers from Groningen (city)
Dutch people of Russian descent
Living people
Russian footballers
Russia youth international footballers
Dutch footballers
Association football forwards
NEC Nijmegen players
TOP Oss players
VV DOVO players
Eerste Divisie players
Derde Divisie players